Lawrence G. McKeon (1857/1858 – July 18, 1915) was an American pitcher in Major League Baseball for three seasons, from 1884 to 1886. He played one season each for the Indianapolis Hoosiers, Cincinnati Red Stockings, and Kansas City Cowboys. He was born in New York City, and died in Indianapolis on July 18, 1915 at age 57. He is interred at St. Mary Cemetery in Port Jervis, New York.

References

External links

1850s births
1915 deaths
Major League Baseball pitchers
Baseball players from New York (state)
19th-century baseball players
Kansas City Cowboys (NL) players
Cincinnati Red Stockings (AA) players
Indianapolis Hoosiers (AA) players
Indianapolis Hoosiers (minor league) players
Kansas City Cowboys (minor league) players
Lafayette (minor league baseball) players